ELAC can refer to:
eLAC Action Plans
East Los Angeles College
Elac, a German loudspeaker manufacturer
Elevator and Aileron Computer of the A320